In geometry, Barrow's inequality is an inequality relating the distances between an arbitrary point within a triangle, the vertices of the triangle, and certain points on the sides of the triangle. It is named after David Francis Barrow.

Statement
Let P be an arbitrary point inside the triangle ABC. From P and ABC, define U, V, and W as the points where the angle bisectors of BPC, CPA, and APB intersect the sides BC, CA, AB, respectively. Then Barrow's inequality states that

 

with equality holding only in the case of an equilateral triangle and P is the center of the triangle.

Generalisation 
Barrow's inequality can be extended to convex polygons.

Here  denotes the secant function.

History

Barrow's inequality strengthens the Erdős–Mordell inequality, which has identical form except with PU, PV, and PW replaced by the three distances of P from the triangle's sides. It is named after David Francis Barrow. Barrow's proof of this inequality was published in 1937, as his solution to a problem posed in the American Mathematical Monthly of proving the Erdős–Mordell inequality. This result was named "Barrow's inequality" as early as 1961.

A simpler proof was later given by Louis J. Mordell.

See also 
 Euler's theorem in geometry
 List of triangle inequalities

References

External links
Hojoo Lee: Topics in Inequalities - Theorems and Techniques

Triangle inequalities